Johansen is a Scandinavian patronymic surname meaning "son of Johan". It is most common in Denmark and Norway.  The Swedish variant is Johansson, while the most common spelling in the US is Johanson.  There are still other spellings.  Johansen is an uncommon given name.  People with the surname Johansen include:

 Allan Johansen (born 1971), Danish professional road bicycle racer
 Anders Johansen
 August E. Johansen (1905-1995), U.S. Representative from Michigan
 Bård Tufte Johansen (born 1969), Norwegian comedian
 William Odd "Red" Johansen (born 1928), Canadian professional ice hockey player 
 Bjørn Johansen (footballer) (born 1969), Norwegian footballer
 Bjørn Johansen (ice hockey) (born 1944), Norwegian ice hockey player
 Bjørn Johansen (musician) (1940–2002), Norwegian jazz musician
 Christian Johansen
 Dan Anton Johansen (born 1979), Danish professional footballer
 Darryl Johansen (born 1959), Australian chess Grandmaster
 David Johansen (born 1950), American singer, songwriter, and actor
 Egil Johansen (musician) (1934–1998), Norwegian-Swedish jazz drummer
 Egil Johansen (footballer) (born 1962), Norwegian footballer
 Egil Johansen (orienteer) (born 1954), Norwegian orienteer
 Egil Borgen Johansen (1934–1993), Norwegian archer
 Elisabeth Johansen (1907–1993), Greenlandic midwife and politician
 Even Johansen
 Eva Margot  born Johansen
 Franz M. Johansen (1928-2018), American sculptor, emeritus professor at BYU
 Gotfred Johansen (1895-1978), Danish lightweight professional boxer 
 H.W. "Woody" Johansen (1913-1991), American engineer and namesake of the Johansen Expressway
 Hans Johansen (1897-1973), Russian-Danish zoologist
 Henry Johansen (1904-1988), Norwegian international football goalkeeper
 Hermann Johansen (1866–1930), Russian zoologist
 Hjalmar Johansen (1867-1913), Norwegian polar explorer
 Holger Hott Johansen (born 1974), Norwegian orienteering competitor 
 Iris Johansen (born 1938), American author
 Jacob Lerche Johansen (1818-1900), Norwegian Minister of the Navy 
 Jan Johansen (canoeist) (born 1944), Norwegian Olympic canoeist
 Jan Johansen (politician) (born 1955), Danish politician and MF
 Jan Arvid Johansen (1947–2017), Norwegian musician
 Jan Johansen (born 1966), Swedish singer
 Johan Strand Johansen (1903-1970), Norwegian Minister of Labour and politician
 John Johansen (athlete) (1883–1947), Norwegian sprinter
 John Christen Johansen (1876-1964), Danish-American portraitist
 John M. Johansen (1916–2012), American architect
 Jon Lech Johansen (born 1983), Norwegian known for reverse engineering data formats
 K. V. Johansen (born 1968), Canadian fantasy and children's author
 K. W. Johansen (born ?), Author of the yield theory for connections (1949)
 Kevin Johansen (born 1964), Argentine-American rock musician
 Kyle Johansen (born 1967), American politician
 Lars Emil Johansen (born 1946), second Prime Minister of Greenland
 Magne Johansen (born 1965), Norwegian ski jumper 
 Michael Johansen (born 1972), Danish professional football player
 Pete Johansen violin player, session member of bands Sirenia, Tristania and others
 Ravi (Ivar Johansen) (born 1976), Norwegian musician 
 Roar Johansen (1935–2015), Norwegian footballer
 Ryan Johansen (born 1992), Canadian ice hockey player
 Sharon Johansen (born 1948), Norwegian-American model and actress
 Stig Johansen (born 1972), Norwegian professional football striker
 Terje Riis Johansen (born 1968), Norwegian politician for the Norwegian Centre Party
 Trevor Johansen (born 1957), retired professional national hockey league player
 Tor Egil Johansen (born 1950), Norwegian footballer

See also
 Johansson
 Johanson
 Johannsen

Danish-language surnames
Norwegian-language surnames
Patronymic surnames
Surnames from given names